Johann Ludwig (Louis) Gerard Krefft (17 February 1830 – 19 February 1881), a talented artist and draughtsman, the Curator of the Australian Museum for 13 years (1861-1874), and a hard-working, effective, and respected scientist and natural historian, was one of Australia's first and most influential zoologists and palaeontologists.
"Some of [Krefft's] observations on animals have not been surpassed and can no longer be equalled because of the spread of settlement." (Rutledge & Whitley, 1974).
"Mr. Krefft was probably the first man who thoroughly studied the reptiles of Australia." (Obituary, in Nature, 21 April 1881).
He is also noted as an ichthyologist for his scientific description of the Queensland lungfish (now recognized as a classic example of Darwin's "living fossils"); and, in addition to his numerous scientific papers and his newspaper articles on natural history, his publications include The Snakes of Australia (1869), Guide to the Australian Fossil Remains in the Australian Museum (1870), The Mammals of Australia  (1871),  and Catalogue of the Minerals and Rocks in the Australian Museum (1873). 

Krefft was one of the very few Australian scientists in the 1860s and 1870s to support Darwin's position on the origin of species by means of natural selection. According to Macdonald, et al. (2007), he was one of the first to warn of the devastating effects of the invasive species (sheep, cats, etc.) on native species. Also, along with several significant others  such as the proprietor of the Melbourne Argus, Edward Wilson, and the trustee of the Australian Museum, George Bennett  Krefft expressed considerable concern in relation to the effects of the expanding European settlement upon the indigenous population. 
"Gerard Krefft is a significant figure in the history of nineteenth century Australian science. He is celebrated not only for his zoological work but as a man who was prepared to challenge individuals on points of scientific fact regardless of their position in Sydney society or metropolitan science. He is also remembered as one who could be abrasive and incautious in delicate political situations and a man whose career and life ultimately ended in tragedy. The dramatic end of Krefft’s career in 1874  where he was stripped of his position as Australian Museum curator, physically removed from the Museum and his character assassinated  often overshadows his early career and his development as a scientist." (Stephens, 2013, p.187)

Family 

Krefft was born on 17 February 1830 in the Duchy of Brunswick (now part of Germany), the son of William Krefft, a confectioner, and his wife Johanna (née Buschhoff).

Education
He was educated at St Martin's College in Braunschweig (i.e.) from 1834 to 1845. As a youth, he was interested in art and wished to study painting. After his schooling, his family found employment for him at a mercantile firm in Halberstadt.

Marriage
He married Annie McPhail (-1926), later (1893) Mrs. Robert Macintosh, on 6 February 1869. They had four children, only two of whom survived their infancy: Rudolph Gerard Krefft (1869-1951), and Herman Gerard Krefft (1879-1911). A fifth child, an unnamed stillborn daughter, was delivered on 2 July 1874.

German heritage
As a German-speaker, Krefft belonged to the largest non-English-speaking group in Australia in the 1800s; and, as such, he was one of a number of influential German-speaking residents  such as William Blandowski, Ludwig Becker, Hermann Beckler, Amalie Dietrich, Diedrich Henne, Friedrich Krichauff, Johann Luehmann, Johann Menge, Carl Mücke (a.k.a. Muecke), Ludwig Preiss, Carl Ludwig Christian Rümker (a.k.a. Ruemker), Moritz Richard Schomburgk, Richard Wolfgang Semon, George Ulrich, Eugene von Guérard, Robert von Lendenfeld, Ferdinand von Mueller, Georg von Neumayer, and Carl Wilhelmi  who brought their "epistemic traditions" to Australia, and not only became "deeply entangled with the Australian colonial project", but also "intricately involved in imagining, knowing and shaping colonial Australia" (Barrett, et al., 2018, p.2).

"Natural history"
Given Vallances' tripartite division (1978) of nineteenth century Australian science  i.e., the proto-scientific period (1788-1839), the pioneer-scientific period (1840-1874), and the classic science period (1875-)  Krefft’s influential Australian career was firmly centred in the pioneer-scientific period. Consequently, and in order to avoid the prochronistic mistake of viewing the past through the eyes of the present, and given,
 that the Australian Museum (established in 1827) is the fifth oldest museum of natural history in the world,
 the need to identify the Australian Museum's orientation during Krefft's tenure,
 the need to identify Krefft’s particular domains of interest (and influence) as a scientist,
 the on-going significance of Krefft's (more than 180) "Natural History" articles published in the Sydney Mail from March 1871 to June 1875, and
 that 19th. century natural history was concerned with the study of nature; and, from this, was directly involved with the evidence obtained from the direct observation of nature (however ambiguously "nature" might be described),
it is important to note that the widely used "umbrella" terms of natural history and natural historian (or naturalist) were generally understood (and applied) in the mid-1800s, especially in relation to museum culture, to the collective enterprises of a wide range of diverse enterprises, now separately identified as, at least, the disciplines of anthropology, astronomy, botany, ethnology, geology, herpetology, ichthyology, palaeontology, and zoology.

In 1822 (pp.iii-iv) Friedrich Mohs drew attention to the inappropriateness of the label natural history, on the grounds that it "does not express the essential properties of the science to which it is applied".

The "Darwinian doctrine" and the consequent "Darwinian controversy"
"What appears so remarkable to [those in] a later age is that in the mid-nineteenth century scientists could look upon a supernatural explanation as a valid alternative to a scientific one."  Ellegård (1990, p.15) 
"Authors of the highest eminence seem to be fully satisfied with the view that each species has been independently created. ... But do they really believe that at innumerable periods in the earth's history certain elemental atoms have been commanded suddenly to flash into living tissues?"  Charles Darwin (1859, pp.488, 483)

Darwin was not the first to speak of "evolution". Robert Chambers, in his popular works, Vestiges of the Natural History of Creation (1844/1884) and Explanations (1845), had already made the notion of "evolution" a matter of public discussion. Also, there were the two (anonymous) articles  recently attributed to Robert Jameson, the Journal's editor (see: Tanghe & Kestemont, 2018)  "Observations on the Nature and Importance of Geology" (Anon, 1826) and "Of the Changes which Life has experienced on the Globe" (Anon, 1827), that had been published in Edinburgh at the time that Darwin was studying medicine at Edinburgh University.

However, Darwin was the first to propose "natural selection" as the process responsible for the diversity of life on Earth. Along with the Sydney botanist, Robert D. FitzGerald, and the Melbourne economist,  Professor William Edward Hearn, Krefft was one of the very few Australian scientists in the 1860s and 1870s to support Darwin's position on the origin of species by means of natural selection. Krefft’s scientific career, and, in particular, his entire professional life at the Australian Museum were concurrent with, and greatly influenced by, the "Darwinian controversy" and its widespread ramifications.

In Alvar Ellegård's extensive (1958) survey of the coverage of the "Darwinian doctrine" within the contemporary U.K. press between 1859 and 1872  within which he (Ellegård, 1990, p.24) distinguished three aspects: "first, the Evolution idea in its general application to the whole of the organic world; second, the Natural Selection theory; and third, [the] theory of Man’s descent from the lower animals"  Ellegård identified five ideological "positions" taken (or ideological "attitudes" displayed) by individual participants over that decade and a half, which were determined, to a considerable extent, not only by their levels of education, but also by their particular politico-social, philosophical, and/or religious orientation. Ellegård's five positions (collectively) reflected a series. As one moved from (A) to (E) along that series, "less and less of the processes going into the formation of species were recognized [by those holding that position] as supernatural, or outside the range of ordinary scientific explanation ... [and, therefore] anybody accepting a position with a higher [level] accepted ipso facto all the scientific explanation already granted by those holding a lower position" (Ellegård, 1990, p.30):
 (A): Absolute Creation (p.30);
 (B): Progressive Creation (p.30);
 (C): Derivation (p.30);
 (D): Directed Selection (p.31); and
 (E): Natural Selection (p.31).

Artist
In order to avoid the military draft, Krefft moved to New York City in 1850, where he was employed as a clerk and a draughtsman, mainly concerned with producing depictions of sea views and shipping.

Whilst in New York, he encountered the work of John James Audubon at the New York Mercantile Library. Having been granted permission to do so, Krefft made copies of some of the Audubon plates, which he then sold to raise his fare to Australia. Krefft arrived in Melbourne in November 1852, and worked in the Victorian goldfields "with much success" for some five years. Krefft contributed examples of his drawings to the Victorian Industrial Society's Exhibition, in Melbourne, in February 1858.

Natural historian, museum curator and administrator

Melbourne
A talented artist and draughtsman, and having met Blandowski when he (Krefft) was making copies of Gould's illustrations in The Mammals of Australia in the Public Library of Victoria, Krefft was hired, by Blandowski, "on the basis of Krefft's ability to
produce detailed drawings of natural history specimens", to help sketch and collect specimens for the National Museum of Victoria on William Blandowski's explorations of the relatively poorly-known and semi-arid country around the confluence of the Murray River and Darling River in 1856–1857.

Blandowski was recalled to Melbourne by the Victorian Government in early August; and Krefft took command of the expedition until it returned at the end of November 1857. In 1858 Krefft was appointed to the National Museum of Victoria, to catalogue the expedition's collection of 17,434 specimens, which he listed under 3389 catalogue numbers.

Sydney
In 1858, following the death of his father, Krefft was obliged to return to Germany, where he travelled via England  where he visited the principal museums, met up with John Gould, John Edward Gray, Albert Günther, and Richard Owen, and presented a paper (Krefft, 1858b) to the Zoological Society of London.

He took many illustrations and specimens with him; however, as Allen (2006, p.33) notes, "after his return to Germany, Krefft attempted to publish his observations and drawings, but was prevented from doing so by Blandowski ... [with] Blandowski claim[ing to Krefft's publisher] that the artwork from the expedition belonged to him, as expedition leader." Krefft returned to Australia from his sojourn in Germany, with brief stays en route at the Cape of Good Hope and Adelaide, arriving in Sydney on 6 May 1860. 

In June 1860, on the recommendation of Governor Sir William Denison,he was appointed Assistant Curator to Simon Rood Pittard (1821–1861). at the Australian Museum, "much to the annoyance of the museum trustees, who would have preferred someone with a formal degree". Pittard, driven by his Anglo-Catholic, Puseyite views  and following the practice of Charles Willson Peale at the Peale Museum, in Philadelphia  adorned the walls of the Museum with inscriptions of biblical texts. Less than three weeks after Pittard’s death (in August 1861) the Trustees decided that these inscriptions were "[to] be removed, and that in future “no words be inscribed on the walls of the Board Room without the consent of the Trustees"." 

Having performed all of the duties of the position since Pittard's death in August 1861, Krefft was eventually appointed Curator of the museum in May 1864.

During his time at the Australian Museum, Krefft maintained a relationship with the Melbourne Museum, corresponding and exchanged specimens with Frederick McCoy, its Director. He also corresponded with a wide range of eminent overseas naturalists, including Charles Darwin, A.K.L.G. Günther, and Sir Richard Owen in the UK; L.J.R. Agassiz in the USA; "and many learned German scientists"  and it is important to note that these interactions of Krefft were "informal communications with individuals rather than official dealings through government agencies, with the ensuing connections giving rise to further interactions with savants and museums in other centres of knowledge and power, including Germany, Austria, Italy, France, Sweden, Argentina, Canada, India and the United States, as well as Britain" (Davidson, 2017, p.8).
"As a scientist Krefft occupied a position far removed from that of the typical collector at the periphery. He was a theoretically sophisticated naturalist whose contribution to the zoological literature of Australia was substantial and of lasting value. His letters to Darwin were those of a colleague and fellow scientist rather than a mere informant, and he took advantage of the existing networks of correspondence in furthering both his own career and the cause of science in the Australian colonies generally."  Butcher, 1988, p.147.

He was also responsible for arranging and cataloguing the Museum's collection of donated fossils, as well as those he had discovered in his own exploratory efforts in the field, such as the two important excavations of the fossil remains of mammals, birds, and reptiles he conducted in 1866 and 1869 at the Wellington Caves.

"The New Museum Idea"
Krefft was "a dynamic figure who vigorously researched, wrote about and promoted the Museum’s collections". He served as the Australian Museum's Curator at a time of significant culture change  both in terms of the place of science and scientific standards within the community, and in terms of the embedded assumptions, foundation principles, and experimental strategies of science itself  when the museum itself was shifting "from [being] a colonial offshoot of the British science establishment, managed by a group of gentleman naturalists, towards [becoming] an institution serving the needs of an increasingly independent and professional group of scientists".

During his tenure as Curator Krefft was responsible for making many significant changes to the Museum's premises and its displays, and, also, for actively promoting the concept of the museum as a popular institution appealing to a broader audience  that is, an establishment designed to provide experiences that engage, entertain, and educate all ages, economic groups, education levels, and social classes  as well as being a place for the collection, preservation, and display of specimens, and the production and dissemination of scientific knowledge.

However, over the time of his tenure, Krefft's advocacy of the complete separation of the Museum's at-the-time confused and disordered collection into:
(a) the exhibition spaces and the ordered, comprehensive, displays for the public (known today as synoptical collections), and
(b) the (systematically housed elsewhere on the premises) specimens, catalogues, and other research material primarily intended for research, rather than display,
produced an on-going culture-clash with the "gentlemen amateurs" among the Trustees, who were collectors themselves, and were "building up [their] private collections sometimes at the expense of the museum"  these included, Dr. James Charles Cox, Edward Smith Hill (brother-in-law of Sir Daniel Cooper), Sir William John Macleay, Captain Arthur Onslow, and Alexander Walker Scott  that eventually led to Krefft's later (1874) dismissal.

Cabinets of curiosities
For at least two centuries British (and colonial) museums, clearly reflecting their Wunderkämmer/Cabinets of Curiosities heritage, had done little more than present "aimless collection[s] of curiosities and bric-à-brac, brought together without method or system of collections"; where, for instance, one of the most famous collections in "bygone days", that of the seventeenth century’s Musæum Tradescantianum (the collection which later provided the nucleus for Oxford University’s Ashmolean Museum), "was a miscellany without didactic value", "its arrangement was unscientific, and the public gained little or no advantage from its existence" (Lindsay, 1911, p.60).

In August 1846, within the Act establishing the Smithsonian Institution, was a provision transferring the custody of the United States' official National Cabinet of Curiosities, previously deposited in the US Patent Office Building, to the Smithsonian.

Public museums
In 1864, towards the end of his lengthy career as the Curator of the British Museum, John Edward Gray, acknowledging the differences between a museum's research and public pedagogy functions, and expressing his hope that his colleagues would "heartily concur in doing all that is in our power to render [the British Museum] and other institutions conducive to the increase of the knowledge, the happiness, and the comforts of the people", remarked that, in his view  "public museums" were meant to serve the dual purposes of "the diffusion of instruction and rational amusement among the mass of the people, and ... to afford the scientific student every possible means of examining and studying the specimens of which the museum consists".

At a time when "Colonial museums tended to exhibit specimens row upon row, and for the most part neglected to incorporate up-to-date techniques such as explanatory labels and habitat cases" (Sheets-Pyenson, 1988, p.123), Gray's scientific position, curatorial rationale, and administrative approach were strongly supported by Krefft  who was "devoted to the museum's interests", rather than to those of the trustees  who had already begun separating his own museum's research collections from its exhibition collections, and had already adopted many of Gray's measures by the early 1860s.

The new museum idea
In 1893, Sir William Henry Flower, labelled Gray's view "The New Museum Idea", describing it as "the key-note of nearly all the museum reform of recent date", (Flower, 1893, pp.29-30). Although these views were not unique to Gray, it does seem that Gray's (1864) axiom had the widest dissemination over the ensuing years, was the most widely quoted and, therefore, can be said to have had the greatest influence  influencing many world-wide, including Krefft, and in the UK, such as Flower, at the British Museum (see: Flower, 1898), and in the USA, such as G. Brown Goode at the Smithsonian Institution (see: Goode, 1895), and Henry Fairfield Osborn, at the American Museum of Natural History (see, Osborn, 1912), etc.

In 1917, American museum director John Cotton Dana lamented the fact that there was still great room for improvement, noting that the best museum displays were to be found in department stores, rather than in museums of the day.

Photography

"A photographic establishment is one of the most essential parts of a modern museum"  Gerard Krefft, 5 August 1868.
One of Krefft’s most important curatorial innovations was his introduction of photography  a medium he had first encountered during his time with the Blandowski Expedition in 1856–1857  into the Australian Museum's practice.

This not only provided a valuable means through which the Museum's objects and collections could be documented, but also served to substantiate the veracity of Krefft’s colonial observations, and enhance his (and the Museum's) international recognition overall, due to the fact that the photographs could also be sent to experts and centres of European and American scholarship other than just to London alone.

Moreover, over time, photographs significantly reduced the need to send precious specimens and samples overseas to the detriment of the Museum's own collections: see, for instance, the (1870) photograph of Krefft's first-ever Queensland lungfish specimen (at Finney, 2022, p.6), and the four (1870) photographs of the specimen at various stages of its dissection by Krefft (at Finney, 2022, pp.6-7).

The thousands of meticulously arranged visual images on the glass plates that Krefft and his assistant, Henry Barnes, produced (over 15 years) through the collodion wet plate process, both on-site (at the museum) and in-the-field, recording landscapes and people (on expeditions), demonstrated and validated Krefft's expertise to all and sundry.

According to Davidson (2017, pp.16, 57, 68), given the London's scientific elite's widespread, prevailing mistrust of the observations and material evidence of the colonial explorers and naturalists, Krefft's images not only provided "incontrovertible photographic evidence" of his claims for a specific item of interest, but also  given the extremely wide range of disciplinary mindsets prevailing at the time  they also served as (inclusive) "boundary objects": viz., entities that "facilitate[d] an ecological approach to knowledge making and sharing" by "provid[ing] connections between different individuals and groups who nevertheless might view them, interpret them, and use them in distinct ways, or for different aims" (p.10).

The Queensland lungfish (Neoceratodus forsteri)

In 1835, having examined teeth that had been extracted from the Rhaetian (latest stage of the Triassic) fossil beds of the Aust Cliff region of Gloucestershire in South West England, Louis Agassiz identified and described ten different species of a holotype (or "type specimen"), which he named ceratodus latissimus (‘horned tooth’ + 'broadest'), and had supposed  based upon the structure of their teeth plates resembling that of a Port Jackson shark  were a kind of shark or ray, and from this, he had postulated, belonged to an order of the class of cartilaginous fishes (Chondrichthyes) collectively known as Chimaera.

Over the years Krefft’s regular dinner companion, the pastoralist squatter and former Premier of New South Wales, William Forster, had often spoken of the Queensland fresh-water salmon with a cartilaginous backbone, known to the Queensland squatters as Burnett Salmon  called "salmon" because of its pink, salmon-coloured flesh  or "barramunda" (N.B. not barramundi). On each occasion, Krefft expressed his view that Forster’s claim of the existence of such a salmon was entirely mistaken.

In January 1870, Forster presented Krefft with an approx. 3ft (92cm) specimen of the Burnett Salmon  the first that Krefft had ever seen  the teeth of which, from his detailed familiarity with the relative scientific literature, he immediately recognized as "a living example of Ceratodus, a creature, thought to have been like a shark, which had hitherto been known only from fossil teeth".

"Natural History" columns in The Sydney Mail
Given that one of Krefft's main objectives, as Curator, was to re-position the Museum as a "forum of people's science" (Moyal, 1986, p.99), and given his recognition of the economic, social, and educational value of a wider dissemination of an accurate, up-to-date knowledge and understanding of scientific matters (especially Australian natural history) to the emerging colony and its developing community, it is significant that Krefft published more than one hundred and fifty, lengthy, once-a-week "Natural History" columns in The Sydney Mail (from March 1871 until June 1874) on an extremely wide range of subjects, that were specifically directed at an educated Australian lay audience (rather than, that is, engaging with his well-informed fellow scientists).

In his first article (Krefft, 1871), reflecting a view that had been expressed a decade earlier by the botanist Joseph Dalton Hooker, Krefft spoke of how, although "few countries offer such a wide field to the student of nature as Australia" there were very few "handy books for the beginner" available in Sydney, "which has caused, in some measure, the apathy of the people to study our natural products". Moreover, he wrote, because "the most useful books" were little known  and many of those were "so expensive that they cannot be purchased, except by the wealthy"  he proposed to present a series of articles on Australian natural history, with the (never realised) hope that their aggregate would eventually be published as a complete work.

Due to the distractions connected with the last stages of his disputes with the trustees of the Australian Museum, the last item he published whilst still Museum curator was on 27 June 1874. Sixteen weeks later, following his separation from the Museum, he resumed his weekly articles, and went on to publish another thirty-three "Natural History" articles over the next nine months.

July 1873

In July 1873, he devoted two of his columns (1873a, 1873b) to

The Darwin Correspondence Project contains an un-dated fragment of a letter from Krefft, in which he explains that, given the "dreadful ... ignorance of even well educated people", and the constant criticisms of Darwin's "theories" voiced in Melbourne by the devout Irish Catholic Professor Frederick McCoy of the National Museum of Victoria, and the Evangelical Anglican Bishop of Melbourne Charles Perry, and, especially, the well-attended (7 July) Sydney lecture by the Melbourne-based Jesuit, Joseph O'Malley, on "Noah's Ark"  with the devout Irish Catholic layman and Puisne Judge of the Supreme Court of New South Wales, Peter Faucett in the chair,

Dismissal from office
The Trustees controversially dismissed Krefft from his position of Curator in 1874. Krefft's assistant curator for the preceding decade, George Masters, had resigned earlier that year, in order "to become curator of the growing collection of Sir William Macleay" (Strahan, 1979, p.135)  a collection which Masters continued to curate, once it was transferred to the Macleay Museum at the University of Sydney, until his retirement in 1912. The Museum trustees, at a special meeting held the day after Krefft's removal from the Museum's premises, appointed the Macleay protégé, Edward Pierson Ramsay, to the position of Curator (Strahan, 1979, p.38), an office that Ramsay held until 1895, when he was succeeded by  Robert Etheridge.

Gold theft and its aftermath
Following his report to the trustees that, upon his return to the Museum on Christmas Eve 1873, he had discovered a robbery (which was never solved) of "specimens of gold to the value of £70", and the trustees (although eager to do so) being unable to find any evidence of Krefft's complicity, he had fallen foul of the Trustees  especially William John Macleay, whose extensive private collection would, in the 1890s, become the foundation of the collections of the Macleay Museum at the University of Sydney (Strahan, 1979, p.37)  with his subsequent accusations that the trustees were using the Museum's resources to augment their own private collections.

Museum closure
In the process of the escalating dispute between the trustees and Krefft, the Museum was closed to the public, by order of the trustees, for eleven weeks  from 4 July 1874 to 23 September 1874  and, at the same time, a police guard was stationed at the Museum, and Krefft was denied access to all parts of the Museum (including the cellar within which the fuel for his much-needed-in-the-winter fires was stored), except his private residence.

Krefft had been suspended following an investigation by a subcommittee of trustees  Christopher Rolleston, Auditor-General of New South Wales, was appointed chairman, and Archibald Liversidge, Professor of Geology and Mineralogy at the University of Sydney, Edward Smith Hill, wine and spirit merchant, and Haynes Gibbes Alleyne, of the New South Wales Medical Board  who, having examined a number of witnesses, found some of the charges against Krefft sustained, and also claim to have discovered "a number of [other] grave irregularities".

Krefft had been unable to meet the trustees' request to appear before them on the Thursday (2 July 1874) because he was unwell (he had supplied a medical certificate to that effect), and that his wife, whose difficult confinement had been attended by George Bennett, had just delivered a stillborn child (on 2 July 1874), a daughter, after two days of intense labour with Krefft by her side the whole time in their residence over the Museum.

Eviction from his residential quarters
On 1 September 1874, three weeks before Krefft's forceful eviction, long-term trustees George Bennett (who, at the time, was attending Mrs Krefft's confinement) and William Branwhite Clarke both resigned "as a consequence of the steps recently taken by the trustees of the Museum with respect to the Curator".

On 21 September 1874, Krefft and his family were physically removed from his Museum apartment within which he had barricaded himself, by the "diminutive bailiff" Charles H. Peart, assisted by two known prizefighters (identified as Kelly and Williams) who had been expressly hired (from Kiss's Horse Bazaar) to effect the eviction, because the Police refused to act  on the grounds that Krefft had not been dismissed by the Government, only by the trustees (and, therefore, it was a civil (and not a police) matter). At the time of his eviction, he was forcibly carried out of his apartment, refusing to move from his chair, and was, then, unceremoniously thrown out into Macquarie street by the prizefighters. The press report of Krefft's subsequent (November 1874) damages action noted that, "throughout the affair [Krefft] had denied the trustees' power to dismiss him; and, on the trustees appealing to the Government, the Colonial Secretary [viz., Henry Parkes] had cautiously told the trustees that, as they thought it expedient to expel [Krefft] without first seeking the advice of the Government, no assistance could be afforded".
 
At the time of his forcible eviction, all of his possessions were seized; and, almost two years after the eviction Krefft was complaining that "my own and my wife's personal property, my books, specimens, scientific instruments, medals and testimonials", all of which had been "illegally taken possession of by the trustees", were still to be returned to him.

Krefft's position
Krefft's position was that the trustees, acting independently of the New South Wales government, had no right to dismiss him.

Trustee's allegations
The trustees  two members of which, William Macleay and Captain Arthur Onslow, "manifested great animus towards Mr. Krefft, and used their utmost exertions to cast obloquy upon that gentleman"  responded by accusing Krefft of drunkenness, falsifying attendance records, wilfully destroying a fossil sent to the Museum by one of its trustees, George Bennett, for its preparation to be sent on the Richard Owen at the British Museum  an entirely false allegation that was completely (and independently) refuted by a letter from Owen, received by Bennett in late June 1874, in which Owen "acknowledged receiving [the fossil specimen] in good order"  and, even, condoning the sale of pornographic postcards. The (fifty to sixty) postcards in question, "some of which were of the most indecent character" (which had been "seen" by one of the trustees "in the workshop of the Museum") had been copied entirely without Krefft's knowledge or consent, by the museum employees (and Krefft's subordinates) taxidermist/photographer Robert Barnes and his brother Henry Barnes.

Legal action and legislative outcome
"[In these matters] I am only one against many and you know that law is expensive and only made for the rich. Had I been an Englishman by birth, had I humbugged people, attended at Church, and spread knowledge on the principle that the God of Moses and of the Prophets made "little apples", I would have gained the day, but [as] a true believer in [your] theory of developement [sic] I am hounded down in this [Paradise] of Bushrangers’ of rogues, Cheats, and Vagabonds".  Krefft to Charles Darwin, 22 October 1874, seeking Darwin's support.
Krefft subsequently brought an action, in November 1874, to recover £2,000 damages for trespass and assault against one of the trustees, Edward Smith Hill, and "the jury, after a short deliberation, found a verdict for the plaintiff, with £250 for damages". The judge (Justice Alfred Cheeke) held that Krefft was a superior officer under government, and that no one had power to remove him but the governor with the advice of the executive council.

In 1876  with John Robertson (rather than Henry Parkes) as Premier  the New South Wales parliament passed a vote of £1,000 to be applied in satisfaction of Krefft's claims. The Government refused to pay unless Krefft renounced all other claims, which Krefft refused to do. He sued the trustees for his medals and property, and was awarded £925. They offered to return his belongings with only £200.

Death 

Krefft died on 19 February 1881, from congestion of the lungs "after suffering for some months past from dropsy and Bright's disease". He was buried in the churchyard of St Jude's Church of England, Randwick, Sydney.

Research
 1864: he published a Catalogue of Mammalia in the Collection of the Australian Museum.
 1865: he published the pamphlet, Two Papers on the Vertebrata of the Lower Murray and Darling and on the Snakes of Sydney (1865a)  the two papers had been read before the Philosophical Society of New South Wales.The pamphlet also included a third paper on the Aborigines of the Lower Murray and Darling (i.e., Krefft,  1865b).
 1869: The Snakes of Australia was published, which was the first definitive work on this group of Australian animals.Unable to find a publisher, Krefft eventually financed the publication himself, and it was published by the Government Printer. Krefft and his publication were praised at the Sydney Intercolonial Exhibition of 1870 and the Scott sisters, Helena Scott (a.k.a. Helena Forde) and Harriet Scott (a.k.a. Harriet Morgan), received a Very High Commendation for the striking artwork that accompanied Krefft's text.
 1870: he published the first scientific description of the Queensland lungfish (Krefft, 1870a, 1870b, 1870c, 1870d)  and, by announcing his discovery in the pages of the Sydney Morning Herald (1870a), rather than in some "learned British journal ... Krefft was not only claiming the lungfish, [but] was also staking a claim for Australian scientific independence".
In November 1889, Norman Lockyer, the founding Editor of Nature, noted that Krefft's discovery of "the Dipnoous [viz., 'having both gills and lungs'] fish-like creature Ceratodus of the Queensland rivers" was "[one] of the more striking zoological discoveries which come within our [first] twenty years [of publication]".
 1871: he published The Mammals of Australia, which also included plates by the Scott sisters.
 1872: Krefft was one of the few scientists supporting Darwinism in Australia during 1870s; and, as of May 1872, became a correspondent of Charles Darwin  see, for instance, Darwin's acknowledgement, in The Formation of Vegetable Mould Through the Action of Worms (Darwin, 1881, p.122) of Krefft's contribution to his investigations.
 1873: Catalogue of the Minerals and Rocks in the Collection of the Australian Museum was published.
 1877 he began the publication of Krefft's Nature in Australia  see: item in the collection of the State Library of New South Wales  a popular journal for the discussion of questions of natural history, but it soon ceased publication.

Learned Society affiliations; awards, etc.

Affiliations
Krefft was:
 A Fellow of the Linnean Society in London.
 A Master and Honorary Member of the Freies Deutsches Hochstift (Free German Foundation) at Frankfurt am Main.
 A Member of the Société Humanitaire et Scientifique du Sud-Ouest de la France (Humanitarian and Scientific Society of the Southwest of France), the Imperial and Royal Geological Society of Austro-Hungary in Vienna, the Royal Geographical Society of Dresden; Royal Society of New South Wales, and the Royal Society of Tasmania.
 A Corresponding Member of the Zoological Society of London, the Senckenberg Nature Research Society of Frankfurt am Main, and the "Society of Scientific Naturalists in Hamburg".

Awards
 In 1869, the Cross of the Order of the Crown of Italy was conferred upon Krefft by Victor Emmanuel II, "in token of his Majesty's appreciation of Mr. Krefft's services in the cause of science".
 He received a gold medal from the Government of New South Wales "for services rendered".
 He held "a silver medal for exhibits from the Emperor of the French, and ... various other silver and bronze medals awarded in the colony". 
 He was awarded "the honorary degree of Doctor of Philosophy".

Legacy 

Apart from his scientific contributions, Krefft is remembered for the demonstration he provided at the Australian Museum, on 14 February 1868, for Prince Alfred  at the time, the Duke of Edinburg and, later, the Duke of Saxe-Coburg and Gotha  involving Henry Parkes' pet mongoose killing several snakes. The mongoose was subsequently presented to the Prince who took it with him when he left Australia on the HMS Galatea in May 1868.
 In 1870 Krefft published the first scientific description of the Queensland lungfish (Krefft, 1870a, 1870b, 1870c, 1870d): the lungfish is now recognized as an organism that is a classic example of Darwin's "living fossils".
 He is honoured in the scientific names of two reptiles endemic to Australia:
 Cacophis krefftii, a species of venomous snake.
 Emydura macquarii krefftii, a subspecies of freshwater turtle.
 Other fauna also named after him:
 Freshwater longtom (Strongylura krefftii), is a species of euryhaline needlefish.
 Krefft's darter (Telicota augias krefftii), a butterfly of the family Hesperiidae, found in the north of Australia.
 Krefft's glider (Petaurus notatus), whose type specimen Krefft collected, was also named after him. 
 Northern hairy-nosed wombat (Lasiorhinus krefftii).
 Snub-nosed garfish (Arrhamphus krefftii)
 The mountain group of Krefftberget in the extreme southwestern part of Barents Island, Svalbard, Norway, was named after him in August 1870, by the Austrian explorer Theodor von Heuglin.
 Krefft Street, in Florey, Australian Capital Territory is named after him.

See also
 :Category:Taxa named by Gerard Krefft
 Darwin's category of "Living Fossils"

Notes

References

Krefft's publications (Books, monographs, pamphlets, in chronological order)

 Krefft, G. (1858a), Catalogue of all Specimens of Natural History collected by Mr Blandowski's Party during an Expedition to the Lower Murray in 1857, Melbourne: National Museum of Victoria.
 Krefft, Gerard (1864), Catalogue of Mammalia in the Collection of the Australian Museum, Sydney: Australian Museum.
Krefft, Gerard (1864), "Directions for the Preservation of Specimens", pp.134-135 in Gerard Krefft, Catalogue of Mammalia in the Collection of the Australian Museum, Sydney: Australian Museum.
 Krefft, G. (1865a), Two Papers on the Vertebrata of the Lower Murray and Darling; and on the Snakes of Sydney, Read before the Philosophical Society of New South Wales, 10th September, 1862, Sydney: Philosophical Society of New South Wales.
 Krefft, G (1866), (Mr. Krefft’s Report on the Fossil Remains found in the Caves of Wellington Valley, made to the Honorable. T. A. Murray, President of the Legislative Council of New South Wales), The Sydney Mail, (Saturday, 22 December 1866), p.2. 
 Krefft, G. (1869), The Snakes of Australia: An Illustrated and Descriptive Catalogue of all known Species, Sydney: The Government Printer.
 Krefft, G. (1870), Guide to the Australian Fossil Remains, Exhibited by the Trustees of The Australian Museum, and Arranged and Named by Gerard Krefft, F.L.S., Curator and Secretary, Sydney: F. White, Government Printer.
 Krefft, Gerard, Forde, Helena & Scott, Harriett (1871), The Mammals of Australia: With a Short Account of all the Species hitherto described, by Gerard Krefft; Illustrated by Harriett Scott and Helena Forde for the Council of Education, T. Richards, Government Printer.
 Krefft, G. (1873), Catalogue of the Minerals and Rocks in the Collection of the Australian Museum, Sydney: Thomas Richards.
 Series 02: Gerard Krefft album of watercolour drawings, ca. 1857-1858, 1861, 1866, collection of the State Library of New South Wales.
 Krefft, G. (1876), A Few Letters and Testimonials from distinguished Men of Science, addressed to Mr. Gerard Krefft, Curator and Secretary of the Australian Museum, from 1858 to 1874, Sydney: G. Krefft.  at SLNSW, pp.105-108.
 Krefft 1877, Krefft v. The Australian Museum Corporation: Mr Krefft's last reply to the Crown Solicitor, who defended this case on behalf of the Government, Sydney: J.A. Engel.  at SLNSW, pp.122-124.

Krefft's contributions to Academic journals, newspapers, etc.
Krefft was a member of many scientific societies, and contributed papers to the Proceedings of the Zoological Society of London and other scientific and popular journals, some of which were also printed separately as pamphlets. For a comprehensive, chronological list (of more than 150 of his contributions), see Whitley (1958, pp.25-34), with some later additions and modifications to that list at Whitley (1969, pp.39-42); also, see Mahoney & Ride (1975, pp.197-215).

 Krefft, G. (1858b), "A Few Remarks on the Habit and Economy of the Brown-Capped Pomatorhinus (P. ruficeps, Hartlaub)", Proceedings of the Zoological Society of London, Vol.26, (22 June 1858), pp.352-353.
 Krefft, G. (10 September 1862), "On the Vertebrated Animals of the Lower Murray and Darling, their Habits, Economy, and Geographical Distribution", Transactions of the Philosophical Society of New South Wales 1862–1865, pp.1–33.
 Krefft, Johann Ludwig Gerard (1865b), "On the Manners and Customs of the Aborigines of the lower Murray and Darling", Transactions of the Philosophical Society of New South Wales, 1862-1865, pp.357-374.
 Krefft, G. (1868), "Description of a new species of Thylacine (Thylacinus breviceps), Annals and Magazine of Natural History, Vol.2, No.10, pp.296-297.
 Krefft, G. (5 August 1868), "The Improvements Effected in Modern Museums in Europe and Australia", Transactions of the Royal Society of New South Wales for the Year 1868 , pp.15-25.
 Krefft, G. (1870a), "To the Editor of the Herald", The Sydney Morning Herald, (Tuesday, 18 January 1870), p.5.
 Krefft, G. (1870b), "Description of a gigantic Amphibian allied to the Genus Lepidosiren, from the Wide-Bay district, Queensland", Proceedings of the Zoological Society of London, No.16, (28 April 1870), pp.221-224.
 Krefft, G. (1870c), "Ceratodus Forsteri (Letter to the Editor)", The Sydney Morning Herald, (Thursday, 9 June 1870), p.3.
 Krefft, G. (1870d), "The Ceratodus Forsteri (Letter to The Editor)", Proceedings of the Zoological Society of London, Vol.3, No.58, (8 December 1870), pp.107-108.
 Krefft, G. (1871), "Natural History: The Natural History of New South Wales", The Sydney Mail, (Saturday, 4 March 1871), p.22.
 Krefft, G. (1872), "To the Editor of the Sydney Mail (on 'Fabulous Australian Animals')", The Sydney Mail, (Saturday, 5 October 1872), p.422.
 Krefft, G. (1873a), "Natural History: Remarks on New Creations", The Sydney Mail, (Saturday, 5 July 1873), p.20.
 Krefft, G. (1873b), "Natural History: Remarks on New Hypotheses", The Sydney Mail, (Saturday, 12 July 1873), p.46.

Other sources

 Adler, K. & Cogger, H.G. (1998), "Early Reptile Photography — A New Entry", Herpetological Review, Vol.29, No.4, December 1998), p.204: includes 1864 photograph of Krefft, taken in Sydney by William Hetzer (a.k.a. Wilhelm Franz Friedrich Hötzer) (1822-1891).
 Allen, H. (2006), "Authorship and ownership in Blandowski's Australien in 142 Photographischen Abbildungen", Australasian Historical Archaeology, Vol.24, pp.31-37. 
 Allen, H. (2009a), "Introduction: Looking again at William Blandowski", Proceedings of the Royal Society of Victoria, Vol.121, No.1 (September 2009), pp.1-10.
 Allen, H. (2009b), "Native Companions: Blandowski, Krefft and the Aborigines on the Murray River Expedition". Proceedings of the Royal Society of Victoria, Vol.121, No.1, (September 2009), pp.129-145: includes three of Kreft's watercolours.
 Anderson, Charles (1939), "Living Fossils", The Australian Museum Magazine, Vol.7, No.1, (1 June 1939), pp.21-24.
 Anderson, Erin Lorraine (2020), Nature on Display: The Wagner Free Institute of Science, 1855-1900, M.A. dissertation, University of Delaware.
 Anonymous (Jameson, Robert) (1826). "Observations on the Nature and Importance of Geology", The Edinburgh New Philosophical Journal, Vol.1, No.2, (July-October 1826), pp.293–302.
 Anonymous (Jameson, Robert) 1827. "Of the Changes which Life has experienced on the Globe", The Edinburgh New Philosophical Journal, Vol.3, NO.2, (July-September 1827), pp.298–301.
 Anon (Chambers, Robert) (1844), Vestiges of the Natural History of Creation, London: John Churchill.
 Anon (Chambers, Robert) (1845), Explanations: A Sequel to Vestiges of the Natural History of Creation, London: John Churchill.
 Anon (1858), "Industrial Exhibitions", The Illustrated Journal of Australasia, Vol.4, No.21, (March 1858), pp.102–106.
 Anon (1868a), "The Duke of Edinburgh in New South Wales: Visit to the Museum", The Sydney Morning Herald, (Saturday, 15 February 1868), p.7.
 Anon (1868b), "The Australian Museum-(I)", The Sydney Mail, (Saturday, 3 October 1868), p.10.
 Anon (1868c), "The Australian Museum-(II)", The Sydney Mail, (Saturday, 10 October 1868), p.6.
 Anon (1870), The Wellington Caves, The Sydney Mail, (Saturday, 26 November 1870), p.15. 
 Anon (1872), "The Progress of Natural Science During the Last Twenty-Five Years", Nature, Vol.7, No.165, (26 December 1872), pp. 137–138. 
 Anon (1873a), "The Progress of Natural Science During the Last Twenty-Five Years", Nature, Vol.7, No.166, (2 January 1873), pp. 158–160. 
 Anon (1873b), "The Recent Progress of Natural Science", The Popular Science Monthly, Vol.2, No.5, (March 1873), pp.597–605.: a combined reprint of the entire text of Anon (1873) and Anon (1874a).
 Anon (1881), "Notes", Nature, Vol.23, No.599, (21 April 1881), pp.588–591. 
 Anon (1895), "The Ceratodus: A German Scientist's Work, The Queenslander, (Saturday, 30 March 1895), p.597.
 Anon (2019), "New Exhibition reveals 'Rogues Gallery' of earliest Scientific Photography", australianphotography.com, 13 February 2019.
 Arthington, Angela H. (2009), "Australian lungfish, Neoceratodus forsteri, threatened by a new dam", Environmental Biology of Fishes, Vol.84, No.2, (January 2009), pp.211–221.
 Ayala, Francisco J. (2009), "Evolution by Natural Selection: Darwin's Gift to Science and Religion", Theology and Science, Vol.7, No.4, (November 2009), pp.323-335. 
 Barrett, L., Eckstein, L., Hurley, A.W. & Schwarz A. (2018), "Remembering German-Australian Colonial Entanglement: An Introduction", Postcolonial Studies, Vol.21, No.1, (January 2018), pp.1-5. 
 Bennett, George (1834), Wanderings in New South Wales, Batavia, Pedir Coast, Singapore, and China: Being the Journal of a Naturalist in those Countries during 1832, 1833, and 1834; Volume I, London: Richard Bentley.
 Beolens, B., Watkins, M. & Grayson, M. (2011), "Krefft", at p. 146, Beolens, B., Watkins, M. &  Grayson, M., The Eponym Dictionary of Reptiles, Baltimore, MD: Johns Hopkins University Press. 
 Boué, Ami (1832), Mémoires Géologiques et Paléontologiques, Paris: F.-G. Levrault.
 Bowen, J. & Bowen, M. (2003), The Great Barrier Reef: History, Science, Heritage, Cambridge: Cambridge University Press. 
 Brainwood, Linda (2014), "Mr Parkes's Mongoose", The Dictionary of Sydney, Glebe, NSW: Dictionary of Sydney Trust.
 Brezina, A. (1904), "The Arrangement of Collections of Meteorites", Proceedings of the American Philosophical Society, Vol.43, No.176, (April 1904), pp.211-247. 
 Brigham, D.R. (1996), ""Ask the Beasts, and They Shall Teach Thee": The Human Lessons of Charles Willson Peale's Natural History Displays", Huntington Library Quarterly, Vol.59, No. 2/3 (January 1996), pp.182-206.  
 Butcher, Barry W. (1988), "Darwin’s Australian Correspondents: Deference and Collaboration in Colonial Science ", pp139-157 in Roy MacLeod & Philip F. Rehbock (eds.), Nature in its Greatest Extent: Western Science in the Pacific , Honolulu: University of Hawaii Press. 
 Chambers, Robert (1884), Vestiges of the Natural History of Creation, Twelfth Edition, with an Introduction relating to the Authorship of the Work by Alexander Ireland, London and Edinburgh: W. & R. Chambers.
 Clarke, William Branwhite (1871), "Ceratodus Forsteri" (a poem), pp.89-90 in Intercolonial Exhibition, The Industrial Progress of New South Wales: Being a Report of the Intercolonial Exhibition of 1870, at Sydney; Together with a Variety of Papers Illustrative of the Industrial Resources of the Colony, Sydney: Thomas Richards, Government Printer.
 Colenso, J.W. (1862), The Pentateuch and Book of Joshua Critically Examined by the Right Rev. John William Colenso, D.D., Bishop of Natal, London: Longman and Co.
 Colenso, J.W. (1873), Lectures on the Pentateuch and the Moabite Stone, London: Longmans, Green, and Co.
 
 Cross, S.R.R., Ivanovskia, N., Duffin, C.J., Hildebrandt, C., Parker, A. & Benton, M.J. (2018), "Microvertebrates from the Basal Rhaetian Bone Bed (latest Triassic) at Aust Cliff, S.W. England", Proceedings of the Geologists' Association, Vol.129, No.5 (October 2018), pp.635-653).
 Dana, J.C. (1917), The New Museum Series: No.2: The Gloom of the Museum, Woodstock, VT: The Elm Tree Press.
 Darragh, Thomas A. "William Blandowski: A Frustrated Life", Proceedings of the Royal Society of Victoria, Vol.121, No. 1, (September 2009), pp.11-60.
 Darwin, C. & Wallace, A., "On the Tendency of Species to form Varieties; and on the Perpetuation of Varieties and Species by Natural Means of Selection", Zoological Journal of the Linnean Society, Vol.3, No.9, (August 1858), pp.45–62. 
 Darwin, Charles (1859), On the Origin of Species by Means of Natural Selection, or the Preservation of Favoured Races in the Struggle for Life, London: John Murray.
 Darwin, Charles (1862), On the Various Contrivances by which British and Foreign Orchids are Fertilised by Insects, and on the Good Effects of Intercrossing, London: John Murray.
 Darwin, Charles (1868a), The Variation of Animals and Plants Under Domestication: Volume I, London: John Murray.
 Darwin, Charles (1868b), The Variation of Animals and Plants Under Domestication: Volume II, London: John Murray.
 Darwin, Charles (1871a), The Descent of Man, and Selection in Relation to Sex: Volume I, London: John Murray.
 Darwin, Charles (1871b), The Descent of Man, and Selection in Relation to Sex: Volume II, London: John Murray.
 Darwin, Charles (1872), The Origin of Species by Means of Natural Selection, or the Preservation of Favoured Races in the Struggle for Life (Sixth Edition, with Additions and Corrections)), London: John Murray: Note that for this, the sixth Edition, the title was changed to The Origin of Species.
 Darwin, C. (1881), The Formation of Vegetable Mould Through the Action of Worms, with Observations on their Habits, London: John Murray.
 Davidson, Kathleen (2017), Photography, Natural History and the Nineteenth-Century Museum: Exchanging Views of Empire , Abingdon: Routledge, 2017. 
 Dawson, Lyndall (1985), "Marsupial Fossils from Wellington Caves, New South Wales; the Historic and Scientific Significance of the Collections in the Australian Museum, Sydney", Records of the Australian Museum, Vol.37, No.2 (1 August 1985), pp.55–69.
 de Blainville, H.M.D. (1822), "Discours Préliminaire: Geology", Journal de Physique, de Chimie, d'Histoire Naturelle et des Arts, Vol.94 (January 1822), pp.liii-lv.
 Diamond, J., Bakhos, C., and Joyce-Johnson (2022), "Paradoxes of Religion and Science in the USA", Skeptic Magazine, Vol.27, No.4, (December 2022), pp.4-8.
 Ellegård, Alvar (1958), Gothenburg Studies in English, Volume VIII: Darwin and the General Reader: The Reception of Darwin's Theory of Evolution in the British Periodical Press, 1859-1872, Goteborg: Elanders Boktryckeri Aktiebolag.
 Ellegård, Alvar (1990), Darwin and the General Reader: The Reception of Darwin's Theory of Evolution in the British Periodical Press, 1859-1872 (with a new foreword by David L. Hull), Chicago: University of Chicago Press, 1990. 
 Finney, Vanessa (2019a), Capturing Nature: Early Scientific Photography at the Australian Museum 1857-1893, Sydney: NewSouth Publishing. 
 Finney, Vanessa (2019b), "When Photography came to the Museum", Explore Magazine, (Autumn 2019), pp.22-30.
 Finney, Vanessa (2022), "Dining on Geologic Fish: Claiming the Australian Ceratodus for Science", Journal for the History of Knowledge, Vol.3, No.1, Article 10, (2022): pp. 1-14. 
 Flower, W.H. (3 July 1893), "Address of Sir William H. Flower, K.C.B., D.C.L.,F.R.S., etc.,President of the Museums Association, on Modern Museums", pp.21-48 in H.M. Platnauer & E. Howarth (eds.), Report of Proceeding with the Papers Read at the Fourth. Annual General Meeting Held in London July 3 to 7, 1893, York: Museum Association, 1893.
 Flower, W.H. (1898), Essays on Museums and Other Subjects Connected with Natural History, London: Macmillan and Co.
 Forbes, Edward (1853), On the Educational Uses of Museums: (Being the Introductory Lecture of the Session 1853-1854), London: Her Majesty’s Stationery Office.
 Garascia, Ann (2020), "Photography, Natural History and the Nineteenth-Century Museum: Exchanging Views of Empire", History of Photography, Vol.44, No.4, pp.313-318. 
 Goode, G.B. (1895), The Principles of Museum Administration, York: Coultas and Volans.
 Goode, G.B. (1901), "The Genesis of the United States National Museum", pp.83-191 in A Memorial of George Brown Goode, Together with a Selection of his Papers on Museums and on the History of Science in America, Washington: Smithsonian Institution.
 Gray, J.E. (1864), "Presidential Address", to the Botany and Zoology, including Physiology Section, pp.75-86 in Report of the Thirty-Fourth Meeting of the British Association for the Advancement of Science; Held at Bath in September 1864, London, John Murray, 1865.
 Gray, J.E. (1872), Catalogue of Shield Reptiles in the Collection of the British Museum, Part II: Emydosaurians, Rhynchocephalia, and Amphisbænians, London: British Museum.
  Günther, Albert (1872), "An Account of a Ganoid Fish from Queensland (Ceratodus)", The Popular Science Review, Vol.11, No.42, (1872), pp.257-266.
 Hart, S. & Ward, D.C. (1988), "The Waning of an Enlightenment Ideal: Charles Willson Peale's Philadelphia Museum, 1790-1820", Journal of the Early Republic, Vol.8, No.4, (Winter 1988), pp.389-418. 
 Hearn, William Edward (1864), Plutology: or, The Theory of the Efforts to Satisfy Human Wants, Melbourne: George Robertson and Co.
 Heaton, J.H. (1879), "Krefft, Johann Louis Gerhard", pp.108-109 in J.H. Heaton, Australian Dictionary of Dates and Men of the Time: Containing the History of Australasia from 1542 to May, 1879, Sydney: George Robertson.
 Hoare, M.E. (1971), "'The Half-Mad Bureaucrat' Robert Brough Smyth (1830-1889)", Historical Records of Australian Science, Vol.2, No.4, (1971), pp.25-40. 
 Hoare, M.E. (1976), "The Relationship between Government and Science in Australia and New Zealand", Journal of the Royal Society of New Zealand, Vol.6, No.3, (August 1976), pp.381-394. 
 Hooker, J.D. (1859), On the Flora of Australia: Its Origins, Affinities, and Distribution: Being an Introductory Essay to the Flora of Tasmania, London: Reeve Brothers.
 Hooker, J.D. (1860), The Botany of the Antarctic Voyage of H.M. discovery ships Erebus and Terror in the Years 1839-1843 under the Command of Captain Sir James Clark Ross, Part III: Flora Tasmaniæ, Vol.I: Dicotylones, London: Reeve Brothers.
 Humphries P. (2003), “Blandowski Misses Out: Ichthyological Etiquette in 19th-century Australia", Endeavour, Vol.27, No.4, (December 2003), pp.160-165. 
 Iredale, T. & Whitley, G.P. (1932), "Blandowski", The Victorian Naturalist, Vol.49, no.4, (5 August 1932), pp.90-96.
 Kean, J. (2009), "Observing Mondellimin, or when Gerard Krefft "saved once more the honour of the exploring expedition"", Proceedings of the Royal Society of Victoria, Vol.121, No.1, (September 2009), pp.109-128.
 Knapman G. (2012), "Curiosities or Science in the National Museum of Victoria: Procurement Networks and the Purpose of a Museum", pp. 82-103 in Sarah Longair & John McAleer, Curating Empire: Museums and the British Imperial Experience, Manchester: Manchester University Press.  
 La Nauze, John Andrew (1949), Political Economy in Australia: Historical Studies, Carlton: Melbourne University Press.
 Leitner, G. (2004), Australia's Many Voices: Australian English — The National Language , Berlin: Mouton de Gruyter. 
 Lindsay, D.E.L. (1911), "Museums of Art", pp.60-64 in Chisolm. H. (ed.), Encyclopædia Britannica, Eleventh Edition: Volume XIX: MUN to ODDFELLOWS, 1911.
 Lockyer, J.N. (1889), "Twenty Years (Editorial)", Nature, Vol.41, No.1045, (7 November 1889), pp.1-5. 
 Luck, Geoffrey (2014), "The Fishiest Fish", Quadrant, Vol.58, No.7/8, (July/August 2014), pp.90-94.
 Macdonald, D.W., King, C.M. & Strachan, R. (2007), "Introduced Species and the Line between Biodiversity Conservation and Naturalistic Eugenics.", pp.173-185 in D.W. Macdonald & K. Service (eds.), Key Topics in Conservation Biology, Oxford: Blackwell Publishing.
 Macinnes, Peter (2012), "A Victim of Fighting Men: Gerard Krefft (1830–1881)", pp.108–115 in Peter Macinnes, Curious Minds: The Discoveries of Australian Naturalists, Canberra: National Library of Australia. 
 Mahoney, J.A. & Ride, W.D.L. (1975), Western Australian Museum Special Publication no.6: Index to the Genera and Species of Fossil Mammalia described from Australia and New Guinea between 1838 and 1868, Perth: The Trustees of the Western Australian Museum.
 Mansergh, I.M., Cheal, D.C., Burch, J.W., and Allen, H.R. (2022), "Something Went Missing: Cessation of Traditional Owner Land Management and Rapid Mammalian Population Collapses in the Semi-Arid Region of the Murray–Darling Basin, Southeastern Australia", Proceedings of the Royal Society of Victoria, Vol.134, No.1, (September 2022), pp.45-84.
 Marshall, T.C. (1944), "The Queensland Lung-Fish: A Living 'Fossil'", Fisheries Newsletter, Vol.3, No.4, (July 1944), p.5.
 McGrouther, Mark A. (2006), "Ichthyology at the Australian Museum: Collections, Databases and the Web", pp.103-116 in Yukimitsu Tomida, Y. (ed), Proceedings of the 7th and 8th Symposia on Collection Building and Natural History Studies in Asia and the Pacific Rim, Tokyo: National Science Museum. 
 Menkhorst, Peter W. (2009), "Blandowski’s Mammals: Clues to a Lost World", Proceedings of the Royal Society of Victoria, Vol.121, No.1, (September 2009), pp.61-89.
 Mohs, Friedrich (1822), Grund-Riß der Mineralogie: 1: Terminologie, Systematik, Nomenklatur, Charakteristik, Dresden: Arnold.
 Mohs, Friedrich (Haidinger, W., trans.) (1825), Treatise on Mineralogy, or The Natural History of the Mineral Kingdom: Volume I, Edinburgh: Archibald Constable and Co.
 Moyal, A.M. (1986), A Bright & Savage Land: Scientists in Colonial Australia, Sydney: Collins. 
 Moyal, Ann & Marks, Robert (2019), "The Scientists and Darwin's The Origin of Species in Nineteenth Century Australia. A Re-Evaluation", Journal & Proceedings of the Royal Society of New South Wales, Vol.152, Part.1, (June 2019), pp. 5-26.
 Mozley, A. (1967), "Evolution and the Climate of Opinion in Australia, 1840-76", Victorian Studies, Vol.10, No.4, (June 1967), pp.411-430. 
 Mulvaney, D.J. & Calaby, J.H. (1985), "So Much That Is New": Baldwin Spencer, 1860-1929: A Biography, Carlton: Melbourne University Press.
 Nancarrow, Jenny (2007), "Gerard Krefft – 'A Singular Man'": A paper presented to the Royal Society of Victoria’s Blandowski’s Expedition to the Murray River: European Naturalists and their Contribution to Science in Australia between 1850 and 1859 Symposium on 21 September 2007.
 Nancarrow, Jenny (2009), "Gerard Krefft: A Singular Man", Proceedings of the Royal Society of Victoria, Vol.121, No.1, (September 2009), pp.146–154.
 O’Connor, D. (1896) "Report on Preservation of Ceratodus", Proceedings of the Royal Society of Queensland, Vol.12, (1897), pp.101-102: O'Connor's letter to the President and Council of the Royal Society of Queensland, dated 7 September 1896; it was read before the Society on 12 September 1896.
 O’Malley, Joseph (1871), Noah's Ark Vindicated and Explained: A Reply to Dr Colenso’s Difficulties, Melbourne: Thomas Verga.
 Olsen, Penny (2022), Feather and Brush: A History of Australian Bird Art, North Clayton: CSIRO publishing. 
 Osborn, H.F. (1912), "The State Museum and State Progress", Science, Vol.36, No.929 (18 October 1912), pp.493-504. 
 Paszkowski, L. (1969), "Blandowski, William (1822–1878)", Australian Dictionary of Biography, National Centre of Biography, Volume 3: 1851-1890: A-C, Melbourne: Melbourne University Press.
 Peale, C.W. (1800), Discourse Introductory to a Course of Lectures on the Science of Nature, etc., Philadelphia, PA: Zachariah Poulson, Junior.
 Peale, C.W. (1804), Guide to the Philadelphia Museum, Philadelphia, PA: The Philadelphia Museum Press.
 Piggott, Ann & Strahan, Ronald (1979), "Trustee-Ridden (1860–1874)", pp.26–46 in Ronald Strahan (ed.), Rare and Curious Specimens: An Illustrated History of the Australian Museum 1827–1979, Sydney: The Australian Museum. 
 Potter, George Reuben (1937), "Tennyson and the Biological Theory of Mutability in Species", Philological Quarterly, Vol.16, No.4, (October 1937), pp.321-343.
 Power, Julie, "Australian Museum puts spotlight on controversial Darwinist Gerard Krefft", The Sydney Morning Herald, Friday, 13 October 2017.
 Rader, K.A. & Cain, V.E.M. (2014), Life on Display: Revolutionizing U.S. Museums of Science and Natural History in the Twentieth Century, Chicago, IL: University of Chicago Press. 
 Rieppel, L. (2019). Assembling the Dinosaur: Fossil Hunters, Tycoons, and the Making of a Spectacle, Cambridge, MA: Harvard University Press. 
 Riley, M. (2016), "An Exact Observer", SL Magazine, Vol.9, No.1, (Autumn 2016), p.30.
 Robin, Libby (2005), "The Platypus Frontier: Eggs, Aborigines and Empire in 19th century Queensland", pp.99-120 in D.B. Rose & R. Davis (eds.), Dislocating the Frontier: Essaying the Mystique, Canberra: ANU E Press.
 Rutledge, M. & Whitley, G.P. (1974), "Krefft, Johann Ludwig (Louis) (1830–1881)", Australian Dictionary of Biography, National Centre of Biography, Volume 5: 1851-1890: K-Q, Melbourne : Melbourne University Press.
 Sclater, P.L. (1870), "The New Australian Mud-Fish, Vol.2, No.32, (9 June 1870), pp.106-107. 
 Sellers, C.C. (1980), "Peale's Museum and 'The New Museum Idea'", Proceedings of the American Philosophical Society, Vol.124, No.1, (29 February 1980), pp. 25-34. 
 Sheets-Pyenson, S. (1988), "How to 'Grow' a Natural History Museum: The Building of Colonial Collections, 1850–1900", Archives of Natural History, Vol.15, No.2, (June 1988), pp.121-147. 
 Shermer, Michael (2009), "Darwin Misunderstood", Scientific American, Vol.300, No.2, (March 2009), p.34.
 Sherriff, John L. (1874), "Government Departments (under the supervision and control of the Colonial Secretary): Australian Museum, Hyde Park", p.45 in John L. Sherriff, The Australian Almanac, Sydney: Sherriff & Downing.
 Simpson, G.G. (1942), "The Beginnings of Vertebrate Palaeontology in North America", Proceedings of the American Philosophical Society, Vol.86, No.1, (25 September 1942), pp.130-188. 
 SLNSW, Manuscripts in the Mitchell Library: Johann Louis Krefft: Papers (File Number FL3169842), collection of the State Library of New South Wales.
 Smith, Belinda, "Australian Museum curator Gerard Krefft's ill-fated fight against the creationist establishment", ABC Science, Sunday, 23 October 2022.
 Star, Susan Leigh & Griesemer, James R. (1989), "Institutional Ecology, 'Translations' and Boundary Objects: Amateurs and Professionals in Berkeley's Museum of Vertebrate Zoology, 1907-39", Social Studies of Science,  Vol.19, No.3, (August 1989), pp.387-420. 
 Stephens, M. (2007), "'A Scientific Library of Some Value’: An Early History of the Australian Museum Library", The Australian Library Journal, Vol.56, Nos.3-4, (November 2007), pp.302-311. 
 Stephens, M.S. (2013), The Australian Museum Library: Its Formation, Function and Scientific Contribution, 1836–1917, (Ph.D. dissertation), University of New South Wales. 
 Stone W. (March 1915), "Titian Ramsey Peale", Cassinia: Proceedings of the Delaware Valley Ornithological Club of Philadelphia 1915, Vol.19, pp.1-13.
 Strahan, Ronald (ed.) (1979), Rare and Curious Specimens: An Illustrated History of the Australian Museum 1827–1979, Sydney: The Australian Museum. 
 Tanghe, Koen B. (2019), "The Fate of William Whewell's Four Palætiological Domains: A Comparative Study", Perspectives on Science, Vol.27, No.6, (November-December 2019), pp.810-838. 
 Tanghe, Koen B. & Kestemont, Mike (2018), "Edinburgh and the Birth of British Evolutionism: A Peek behind a Veil of Anonymity", BioScience, Vol.68, No.8, (August 2018), pp.585–592. 
 Taylor, Andrew, "Australian Museum: Descendant steps onto site of Gerard Krefft's shock sacking", The Sydney Morning Herald, Friday, 3 July 2015
 Turnbull, Paul (2017), Science, Museums and Collecting the Indigenous Dead in Colonial Australia, Cham: Palgrave Macmillan.  
 Vallance T.G. (1978), "Pioneers and Leaders — A Record of Australian Palaeontology in the Nineteenth Century", Alcheringa, Vol.2, No.3, (January 1978), pp.243-250. 
 van Leeuwen, Michael (1998), "Simon Rood Pittard (1821–1861) Curator of the Australian Museum", Archives of Natural History, Vol.25, No.1, (February 1998), pp.9-24. 
 Whewell, W. (1834), "On the Connexion of the Physical Sciences, by Mrs. Somerville (Book Review)", The Quarterly Review, Vol.51, No.101, (March 1834), pp.54-68.
 Whewell, W. (1837), History of the Inductive Sciences, from the Earliest to the Present Times: Volume III, London: John W. Parker.
 Whewell, W. (1847), The Philosophy of the Inductive Sciences, Founded upon their History, Volume II, London: John W. Parker.
Whitley, Gilbert P. (1927), "The Queensland Lungfish", The Australian Museum Magazine, Vol.3, No.2, (April-June 1927), pp.50-52.
 Whitley, Gilbert P. (1929), "The Discovery of the Queensland Lungfish", The Australian Museum Magazine, Vol.3, No.11, (July-September 1929), pp.363-364.
 Whitley, Gilbert P. (1958), "The Life and Work of Gerard Krefft", Proceedings of the Royal Zoological Society of New South Wales for the Year 1958-59, pp.21-34.
 Whitley, Gilbert P. (1969), "Gerard Krefft (1831-1881) and his Bibliography", Proceedings of the Royal Zoological Society of New South Wales for the Year 1967-68, pp.38-42.
 Williams, D., Wüster, W., Fry, B.G., "The Good, the Bad and the Ugly: Australian Snake Taxonomists and a History of the Taxonomy of Australia's Venomous Snakes, Toxicon, Vol.48, No.7, (1 December 2006), pp.919–930.  
 Wilson, Edward (1856a), "The Aborigines", The Argus, (Sunday, 16 March 1856), pp.4-5.
 Wilson, Edward (1856b), "The Aborigines", The Sydney Morning Herald, (Saturday, 22 March 1856), p.5.
 Zimmermann, Paul (1906), "Krefft, Johann Gerhard Louis R.", pp.373-374 in R. von Liliencron (ed.), Allgemeine Deutsche Biographie: Einundfünfzigster Band: Nachträge bis 1899: Kálnoky — Lindner, Die Historische Kommission bei der Königlich Bayerische Akademie der Wissenschaften, Leipzig: Dunder & Humblot.

External links

Gerard Krefft in the National Library of Australia's collection
 1860s: A Naturalist's Legacy, Museullaneous, (Australian Museum), 28 April 2017.
 Wooley, Charles & McKay, Kim (2018), "Treasures podcast, episode 3: Charles Darwin and the curator’s chair", Museullaneous, (Australian Museum), 26 March 2018.
 Watson, Joey & Street, Julie (7 June 2019), "These early black-and-white science photographs showed Australian animals to the world", ABC News.
  

1830 births
1881 deaths
People from the Duchy of Brunswick
Scientists from Braunschweig
German emigrants to Australia
Explorers of Australia
Scientific illustrators
Australian ichthyologists
Australian naturalists
Australian paleontologists
Australian zoologists
Fellows of the Linnean Society of London
19th-century Australian public servants
19th-century Australian scientists
Australian curators
Directors of museums in Australia
Critics of creationism